The House of a Thousand Candles is a 1936 American thriller film directed by Arthur Lubin and starring Phillips Holmes, Mae Clarke and Irving Pichel. It is based on the 1906 novel by Meredith Nicholson. The novel had been filmed twice before, once in 1915 (as The House of a Thousand Candles) and again in 1919 by Henry King (under the title Haunting Shadows).

A British secret service agent is sent to try to prevent a plot to derail a peace conference in Geneva and threaten international peace.

Plot
Unscrupulous casino owner Anton Sebastian secretly runs a network of spies out of his hotel and casino, "The House of a Thousand Candles". After killing one of his spies, Victor Demetrius, via poison, he sends a secret message over the radio to a dancer, Raquel. Sebastian orders him to intercept a British intelligence agent Tony Carleton and steal some top-secret documents.

British intelligence officer Sir Andrew McIntyre instructs agent Carleton to pick up some opera tickets in an envelope which contains secret information, and then to go to Geneva. Tony gets the envelope and boards a train, but is followed by his American admirer, Carol Vincent.

On the train, Raquel slips Tony a drugged drink, steals all of his papers and then escapes to meet Sebastian at the hotel. Tony jumps off the train and Carol follows. They arrive at the hotel and register as brother and sister.

Carol hides in Raquel's room when Sebastian plants a microphone. She goes to his study and sees his storage place for stolen papers. Then she listens in to Tony and Raquel. Raquel is about to tell Tony who she works for when she is killed by her maid Marta, who is loyal to Sebastian.

Tony and the envelope are captured by Sebastian, who plans to kill him and make it look like an accident. Tony agrees to decode the information on the envelope to protect Caroo but she tries to stop him by burning it. The flames reveal the real information.

Sebastian leaves with the message, and Alf and Barrie, other secret agents, rescue Tony and Carol. They find Sebastian's secret codes, after which Tony sets out in pursuit of Sebastian. Barrie uses the codes to broadcast to Sebastian's men, saying Sebastian is a murderer who stole Sebastian's car – and they drive him off the road.

Tony and Carol get married.

Cast
 Mae Clarke as Carol Vincent
 Irving Pichel as Anton Sebastian
 Phillips Holmes as Tony Carleton
 Rosita Moreno as Raquel
 Fred Walton as Alf 
 Hedwiga Reicher as Maria 
 Lawrence Grant as Sir Andrew McIntyre 
 Frederick Vogeding as Travers 
 Michael Fitzmaurice as Keith Barrie 
 Rafael Storm as Jules Gregoire 
 Mischa Auer as Demetrius
 Paul Ellis as Agent 
 Keith Daniels as Steward 
 Charles De Ravenne as Radio Attendant 
 Olaf Hytten as Sergeant 
 John Sutton as Young Man
 Max Wagner as Henchman

Production
House of a Thousand Candles had been previously filmed before in 1919 as an American silent film, as Haunting Shadows. It was directed by Henry King and starred H. B. Warner, Edward Piel Jr., Charles Hill Mailes and Florence Oberle. Filming of this version took place in December 1935.

Reception
The New York Times called it "lively... briskly directed... effectively played."

Diabolique magazine called it "creaky and is hampered, as many Lubin films would be, by a lack of star power in the lead roles, which really should be played by stars, but it is quick and light and Lubin clearly has affection for his characters."

Lubin himself said he thought the picture was "charming".

References

External links
The House of a Thousand Candles at IMDb
The House of a Thousand Candles at TCMDB
House of a Thousand Candles at Letterbox DVD
House of a Thousand Candles at BFI
Review of film at Variety
Text of original novel at Project Gutenberg

1936 films
1930s action thriller films
1930s spy films
American action thriller films
American spy films
Films directed by Arthur Lubin
American black-and-white films
Republic Pictures films
1930s English-language films
Films set in Switzerland
Films based on American novels
Remakes of American films
Sound film remakes of silent films
1930s American films